Chodhyam is an unreleased Indian Malayalam-language film directed by G. S. Vijayan, starring Mohanlal, Rahman and Rupini. The film was made in the year 1990. The film is a remake of 1989 Kannada movie Tarka, which was based on the 1958 Agatha Christie play The Unexpected Guest. The producer of this movie, R.B.Choudary had earlier produced the Tamil remake version of the Kannada movie in 1990 titled Puriyaadha Pudhir.

Plot

Rahman escapes from prison and takes shelter in Rupini' s house. He finds that her husband  Captain Raju is murdered. Rahman asks Rupini to hide him from the police. As Rupini knows him from her college days, she believes him to be innocent. Later Rahman finds that Rupini already knew that her husband has been murdered. Rahman suspects Rupini. The suspense is revealed by CBI Officer Mohanlal.

Cast 

Mohanlal
Rahman
Rupini
Captain Raju
Ashokan
Ramu
Thikkurissy Sukumaran Nair
Lissy
Jagathy Sreekumar
Siddhique
Philomina
Bobby Kottarakkara

References

Unreleased Malayalam-language films
Super Good Films films
Malayalam remakes of Kannada films
Films directed by G. S. Vijayan
Films based on works by Agatha Christie